Emiliya Vacheva (born 1 March 1973) is a Bulgarian judoka. She competed in the women's half-lightweight event at the 1992 Summer Olympics.

References

External links
 

1973 births
Living people
Bulgarian female judoka
Olympic judoka of Bulgaria
Judoka at the 1992 Summer Olympics
Sportspeople from Sofia
20th-century Bulgarian women